A Taxpayer Identification Number (TIN) is an identifying number used for tax purposes in the United States and in other countries under the Common Reporting Standard. In the United States it is also known as a Tax Identification Number or Federal Taxpayer Identification Number. A TIN may be assigned by the Social Security Administration or by the Internal Revenue Service (IRS).

Types
Any government-provided number that can be used in the US as a unique identifier when interacting with the IRS is a TIN, though none of them are referred to exclusively as a Taxpayer Identification Number. A TIN may be:
 a Social Security number (SSN)
 an Individual Taxpayer Identification Number (ITIN)
 an Employer Identification Number (EIN), also known as a FEIN (Federal Employer Identification Number)
 an Adoption Taxpayer Identification Number, used as a temporary number for a child for whom the adopting parents cannot obtain an SSN
 a Preparer Tax Identification Number, used by paid preparers of US tax returns

SSNs
SSNs are used by people who have or had the right to work in the United States.

ITINs
ITINs are used by aliens who may or may not have the right to work in the US, such as aliens on temporary visas and non-resident aliens with US income.

EINs
EINs are used by employers, sole proprietors, corporations, LLCs, partnerships, non-profit associations, trusts, estates of decedents, government agencies, certain individuals, and other business entities.

Relevant Internal Revenue Code sections
Section 6109(a) of the Internal Revenue Code provides (in part) that "When required by regulations prescribed by the Secretary [of the Treasury or his delegate] [ . . . ] Any person required under the authority of this title [i.e., under the Internal Revenue Code] to make a return, statement, or other document shall include in such return, statement or other document such identifying number as may be prescribed for securing proper identification of such person."

Internal Revenue Code section 6109(d) provides: "The social security account number issued to an individual for purposes of section 205(c)(2)(A) of the Social Security Act [codified as ] shall, except as shall otherwise be specified under regulations of the Secretary [of the Treasury or his delegate], be used as the identifying number for such individual for purposes of this title [the Internal Revenue Code, title 26 of the United States Code]."

See also

US taxation 

 Taxation in the United States

Number use 
 Personal identification number (PIN)
 Primary key
 Serial number
 Single version of the truth
 Surrogate key
 Transaction authentication number
 Unique identifier (UID)
 UID (disambiguation) § Identifying numbers
 VAT identification number

References

External links 
 Taxpayer Identification Numbers (TIN) on IRS.gov

Taxation in the United States
Unique identifiers
Taxpayer identification numbers
Company identification numbers